Clypeaster cyclopilus is a species of sea urchins of the Family Clypeasteridae. Their armour is covered with spines. Clypeaster cyclopilus was first scientifically described in 1941 by Hubert Lyman Clark.

See also 

 Clypeaster australasiae
 Clypeaster chesheri
 Clypeaster durandi

References 

Animals described in 1941
Clypeaster